Nuestra Belleza Sinaloa 2011,  was held at the Mazatlan International Center in Mazatlán, Sinaloa, Mexico, on July 8, 2011. Twelve contestants competed for the title. At the end of the final night of competition, Grecia Gutiérrez of Los Mochis was crowned the winner by the outgoing Nuestra Belleza Sinaloa titleholder, Tiaré Oliva.

Results

Placements

Special awards

Judges
Patricia Green - image consultant
Daniel Vicente Gómez - make-up artist
Amina Blancarte - Nuestra Belleza Sinaloa 1994
Mónica Coppel - promoting tourism
Esmeralda Porra - cosmetologist
Álex Rivera - photographer
Perla Beltrán - Nuestra Belleza Mundo México 2008

Contestants

References

External links
Official Website

Nuestra Belleza México
2011 in Mexico